The Grozny–Tuapse oil pipeline is a  long pipeline connecting oil fields near Grozny, Russia, with sea port Tuapse.

Background 
The pipeline was launched in 1928, designed by Vladimir Shukhov. The annual throughput of the pipeline along with its 11 pumping stations was 1.5 million tons. It used  pipes, both welded and weldless. In 1938, oil extraction in Krasnodar territory near Maykop began. The main pipeline was used as a products pipeline, while its end part transported oil from the Krasnodar fields to Tuapse.

The pipeline was built in a move for the country to export as much oil as possible to bring in foreign currencies, as part of the First Five-Year Plan. Since 1894, the oil was transported out of Grozny through train carriage.

See also 

 Timeline of Grozny

References

Further reading 
  Rainer Graefe, Jos Tomlow: “Vladimir G. Suchov 1853-1939. Die Kunst der sparsamen Konstruktion.”, 192 S., Deutsche Verlags-Anstalt, Stuttgart, 1990, .
  "В.Г.Шухов - выдающийся инженер и ученый", Труды Объединенной научной сессии Академии наук СССР, посвященной научному и инженерному творчеству почетного академика В.Г.Шухова. М.: Наука, 1984, 96 с.
  Шухова Е. М.: «Владимир Григорьевич Шухов. Первый инженер России.», 368 стр., Изд. МГТУ, Москва, 2003, .

Oil pipelines in Russia
Oil pipelines in the Soviet Union
Buildings and structures built in the Soviet Union
Vladimir Shukhov structures
Transneft
Black Sea energy